Británico Antonio Salas Díaz, better known as Tito Salas (8 May 1887 – 18 March 1974), was a Venezuelan painter, considered a significant contributor in the development of Venezuelan modern art.

References

Further reading
Fundación Polar (1998). Diccionario multimedia de historia de Venezuela [CD-Rom]. Caracas.
Galería de Arte Nacional (1984). Diccionario de las artes visuales en Venezuela. (Vol. 2). Caracas.
Méndez Sereno, C. (1995). Petare a través del tiempo. Los Teques: Biblioteca de Autores y Temas Mirandinos.
Museo de Arte Popular de Petare (1988) Tito Salas. Una vida por el arte. Miranda.
Pineda, R (1969). La pintura de Tito Salas. Caracas: Ernesto Armitano, Editor.
Vargas Mendoza, L. (1980). El tiempo está puesto en Petare. Miranda: Concejo Municipal del Distrito Sucre.

1887 births
1974 deaths
Académie Julian alumni
People from Caracas
Alumni of the Académie de la Grande Chaumière
20th-century Venezuelan painters
20th-century Venezuelan male artists
Male painters